The 1989 IBF World Championships the sixth edition of the IBF World Championships which were held in Jakarta, Indonesia, in 1989.

Venue
Istora Senayan

Medalists

Medal table

Medalists

References
Results
Draws
Badminton.de: Men's singles draw

 
BWF World Championships
IBF World Championships
Badminton World Championships
Badminton World Championships
Sports competitions in Jakarta
Badminton tournaments in Indonesia